South Korean singer-songwriter, record producer and actress IU has embarked on numerous headlining concert tours, four of which toured multiple countries in Asia.

Real Fantasy 

Real Fantasy was the first concert tour by IU. She toured six cities in South Korea: Seoul, Ulsan, Jeonju, Suwon, Busan and Daegu. The tour began on June 2, 2012, with two dates in Seoul and finished on July 15 in Daegu. Two dates in Seoul were added to celebrate the end on the tour.

Background 
On April 16, 2012, Loen announced IU would tour concert halls in six cities in South Korea: Seoul, Ulsan, Jeonju, Suwon, Busan and Daegu. Tickets for the first two dates in Seoul were put on sale on Interpark the next day and sold out in 30 minutes. IU released a single album, Spring of a Twenty Year Old, on May 11. The stages of the three songs included in the album were revealed for the first time at the concert. On August 27, it was announced that IU would hold two additional encore concerts on an outdoor stage in Seoul on September 22 and 23. Tickets were put on sale on Interpark on September 3. A special DVD was released digitally on December 18, while the physical version was released on December 27. It included footage of the encore concert held in Seoul on September 22, about 50 minutes of live performances, concert rehearsals and interviews, other videos, an 84-page photo book, and 30 star cards, as well as songs from Spring of a Twenty Year Old and Last Fantasy.

Show overview and reception 

The music director was G. Gorilla, singer-songwriter and member of the South Korean rock band Eve. For the concert, IU collaborated with the Urban Pops Orchestra. The concert opened with "the dreamlike atmosphere" of "Cruel Fairytale" and "You & I". IU performed "Peach", "Rain  Drop", "Nagging", "The Night of the First Breakup", "Mia", "Every End of the Day", "Love Attack", "Marshmallow", "Uncle". During "Nagging" and "Uncle", she was joined on stage by Lim Seul-ong and Heo Kyung-hwan, respectively. She performed dance covers of a mix of songs, including "Boom Boom Pow" by Black Eyed Peas, "Rainism" by Rain and "Trouble Maker" by Trouble Maker. Several singers made guest appearances during the tour, including Lee Juck, Lee Seung-gi, 2AM, Sung Si-kyung, K.Will, Kim Tae-woo, Leessang, Sunny Hill, Jia, Ra.D, Haha, Norazo, Sweet Sorrow, Baechigi, Mighty Mouth, Huh Gak and Second Moon. Others celebrities that made an appearance include Noh Hong-cheol, Park Ji-sung, Yoo In-na and Ji Hyun-woo.

The tour recorded an average ticket sale rate of 90% in 11 dates in six cities and attracted 20,000 spectators. The additional two dates in Seoul attracted 8,000 spectators. After the first two-day concert in Seoul, it was reported that 43.8% of ticket purchasers were in their 20s, 24.2% were in their 30s and 19.6% were in their 40s, while only 12.4% were in their teens. Furthermore, 71% of the spectators were male, which was considered uncommon for a K-pop concert. The first show in Seoul was well received and IU's ability to confidently lead a three-hour concert by herself was praised alongside her vocals and dancing skills. Lee Mi-young of JoyNews24 commented that the performance was enjoyable for both young adults and families. Park Young-woong of Star News said that "it was a performance that predicted IU's future". The tour as a whole received positive reviews.

Tour dates

Modern Times 

Modern Times was the second concert tour by IU, launched in support of her third studio album Modern Times (2013). She visited two cities in South Korea: Seoul on November 23 and 24, 2013, and Busan on November 30 and December 1.

Background 
Following the release of her third studio album Modern Times (2013), IU started promoting the album on music shows but had to cancel the remaining activities due to her casting in the television series Bel Ami (2013–2014). On October 15, 2013, it was announced that IU would hold her second concert tour Modern Times to support the album. She performed at Kyung Hee University Peace Hall in Seoul on November 23 and 24, 2013, and at Busan KBS Hall in Busan on November 30 and December 1.

Show overview 
IU presented songs from Modern Times and rearranged versions of her past hit songs. She started the concert with "The Red Shoes". She played the role of a woman seeking revenge after her lover abandoned her in "Wait" and "Obliviate"s stages. During "Mia", "I Really Don't Like Her" and "Voice Mail", IU sat down and performed with her acoustic guitar. She also performed "Wild Flower", "You Know", "Every End of the Day", "You & I", "Good Day", "Modern Times" and "Secret".

Tour dates

Chat-Shire 

Chat-Shire was the third concert tour by IU. She toured four cities in South Korea: Seoul, Busan, Daegu and Gwangju. The tour began on November 21, 2015, with two dates in Seoul and finished on December 31.

Background 
On October 19, 2015, four days before the release of IU's fourth extended play, Chat-Shire, it was announced that the singer would hold her third concert tour Chat-Shire in support of the EP, and would not perform on music shows to focus on live performances and her health, which had been deteriorating due to hectic schedules. Starting in November, the tour four cities in South Korea: Seoul, Busan, Daegu and Gwangju. Tickets for the first two concerts in Seoul were put on sale on Interpark on October 26 and, according to Loen, sold out in one minute. Ticket sales for the concert in Busan started on October 29. On December 8, it was announced that IU would hold two additional encore concerts at Jamsil Students' Gymnasium in Seoul on December 30 and 31. Tickets were put on sale on Interpark on December 10. On December 31, Loen announced on Facebook that a limited edition photo book would be sold alongside ticket reservations. It would also be sold on Melon Shopping.

Despite its success, Chat-Shire became controversial when the Korean publisher of the novel My Sweet Orange Tree (1968), from which IU took inspiration for the b-side "Zezé", criticized IU's "sexual" interpretation of the five-year-old protagonist in the lyrics of the song and on the EP's cover artwork. The scandal started a heated debate in the Korean entertainment industry over freedom of interpretation. As the main producer of the EP, she was also criticized for illegally sampling Britney Spears' 2007 song "Gimme More" on a bonus track of the EP. As a result, many ticket reservations were allegedly cancelled.

Show overview and reception 

The concert lasted circa two hours, during which IU performed 20 songs. The first half focused on dance songs, while in the second half IU presented her popular ballads. IU appeared on the stage as a "fairy tale protagonist" wearing a white dress and opened the show with "Shoes". Upon presenting "Zezé", she said "It's a song in the new album. It's a song I love unchangingly". The concert marked IU's first performance of "Twenty-Three", during which she wore a black crop top and hot pants. Commenting on the outfit, she said "I thought it was like Sailor Moon. Isn't it like the clothes of a female protagonist who transforms?". She performed a mix of "lively" and "heartfelt" songs, including "Every End of the Day", "You & I", "The Red Shoes", "The Shower", "Knees", "Bad Day", "Obliviate", "Red Queen", "Everyone Has Secrets" and "See you on Friday". She also sang "My Old Story" and "Meaning of You" from her remake album A Flower Bookmark (2014), as well as a medley of the theme songs of Sailor Moon (1992–1997), Cardcaptor Sakura (1998–2000) and Yumeiro Patissiere (2009–2010). She ended the show with her hit song "Good Day". IU came back on stage for the encore and performed "Heart", "Glasses" and her unreleased song "Drama", which would later be featured on her 2021 EP Pieces.

Among sets, IU took the time to interact with the audience and share personal stories. During the first concert in Seoul, Dynamic Duo joined IU on the stage for "Leon" and performed their songs "Jam" and "Friday Night". Several celebrities made guest appearances during the two-day concert in Seoul, including IU's boyfriend at the time Chang Kiha, Kwon Jung-yeol of 10cm, Yoo In-na, Ji Hyun-woo, Han Seung-yeon, Goo Hara, Lim Seul-ong, Baek A-yeon, Hyukoh, Epik High and GFriend.

The tour attracted 15,000 spectators for the first five performances. IU's vocals and versatility were praised. Choi Hyun-jung of The Dong-a Ilbo said it was "a concert that combines story and song". The concert held on November 21 was IU's first public appearance following the scandal. After a discussion with her music director, she decided to include "Zezé" in the set list despite the controversy. Critics commended IU for her decision, which was perceived as a bold move from the singer that showed "the affection and sincerity she had for this song". Choi Hyun-jung wrote, "IU is a singer with a much stronger mentality than we thought, and at her concert that day, she overcame her burden with her sometimes strong and witty appearance".

Tour dates

24 Steps: One, Two, Three, Four

Set list 
This set list is representative of the show on December 4, 2016, in Seoul.

 "Twenty-Four"
 "Red Queen" 
 "Pierrot Smiles At Us"
 "Shoes"
 "Every End of the Day"
 "You & I"
 "Someday"
 "A Dreamer"
 "I Really Don't Like Her"
 "Mia" 
 "Meaning of You"
 "Summer Love" 
 "Sogyeokdong"
 "4AM"
 "Glasses" 
 "Zezé"
 "Knees
 "Boo" / "Marshmallow"
 Cover medley of the theme songs of Slam Dunk,  and Full Moon o Sagashite
 "Leon"
 "Merry Christmas in Advance"
 "See you on Friday" / "Let It Snow"
 "Good Day"
Encore
 "The Shower"
 "Heart"
 "You Know"

Tour dates

Palette

Dlwlrma

Love, Poem

The Golden Hour: Under the Orange Sun

Other concerts

References 

IU
IU